The men's 400 metres hurdles event at the 1999 Pan American Games was held July 27–28.

Medalists

Results

Heats
Qualification: First 3 of each heat (Q) and the next 2 fastest (q) qualified for the final.

Final

References

Athletics at the 1999 Pan American Games
1999